The Central Loloish languages, also known as Central Ngwi, is a branch of Loloish languages in Bradley (1997). It is not used in Lama's (2012) classification. Central Loloish is also not supported in Satterthwaite-Phillips' (2011) computational phylogenetic analysis of the Lolo-Burmese languages.

Languages 
Lama (2012) considers Central Loloish to be paraphyletic, and splits up Bradley's (1997) Central Loloish into the following independent branches of Loloish. The Lawu language group has been added from Yang (2012) and Hsiu (2017).
Lisoish languages: Lisu, Lolopo, Lipo, Lalo, Taloid languages, etc.
Nusoish languages: Nusu, Zauzou (Rouruo)
Lahoish languages: Lahu, Kucong
Lawoish languages: Lawu, Awu, Lewu
Jinuo

Lisoish is the largest and most diverse group. Jinuo is classified as a Hanoish (Southern Loloish) language in Lama (2012).

Innovations 
Pelkey (2011:367) lists the following as Central Ngwi innovations.
Proto-Ngwi tone categories 1 and 2: tone splitting that is widespread
Proto-Ngwi tone category 2 splits to *glottal-prefixed initials (higher-pitched reflexes) and *non-glottal-prefixed initials (lower-pitched reflexes; with a subsequent flip-flop in Lahu)
Proto-Ngwi tone category L prefixed stop initials > high/rising pitch reflexes
Family group classifiers paradigmatized with disyllabic forms, vowel leveling, and other systemic changes
Burmic extentive paradigm is moderately grammaticalized; more than Southern Ngwi, but fewer than Northern Ngwi
Lexical innovations for 'dog' and 'fire'

References 

Bradley, David (1997). "Tibeto-Burman languages and classification". In Tibeto-Burman languages of the Himalayas, Papers in South East Asian linguistics. Canberra: Pacific Linguistics.
Lama, Ziwo Qiu-Fuyuan (2012). Subgrouping of Nisoic (Yi) Languages. Ph.D. thesis, University of Texas at Arlington.
Pelkey, Jamin. 2011. Dialectology as Dialectic: Interpreting Phula Variation. Berlin: De Gruyter Mouton.